The 2012 Sultan Azlan Shah Cup is the 21st edition of the Sultan Azlan Shah Cup. It was held from 24 May to 3 June 2012 in Ipoh, Perak, Malaysia. New Zealand won their first ever title by defeating Argentina with 1–0 in the final, while five-time champions India took the bronze medal by defeating Great Britain scoring 3–1.

Participating nations
Seven countries participated in this year's tournament:

Results
All times are Malaysia Standard Time (UTC+08:00)

Pool

Classification

Fifth and sixth place

Third and fourth place

Final

Awards
The following awards were presented at the conclusion of the tournament:

Statistics

Final standings

Goalscorers

References

External links
Official website

2012
2012 in field hockey
2012 in Malaysian sport
2012 in Argentine sport
2012 in New Zealand sport
2012 in Pakistani sport
2012 in South Korean sport
2012 in Indian sport
2012 in British sport
May 2012 sports events in Asia
June 2012 sports events in Asia